McBee High School is a public secondary school serving grades 6 through 12 in McBee, South Carolina. The school is located on McBee's west side, near the intersection of Highway 151 and 1. It has an approximate enrollment of 500 students, and is one of four high schools under the jurisdiction of Chesterfield County Public School District.

Students
Students come from two elementary schools, McBee Elementary School and Plainview Elementary School.

Annual events
Sandhills Classic Band Invitational – late September 
Homecoming Football Game and Parade – late October

References

External links 
 School website
 Chesterfield County School District website

Public high schools in South Carolina
Schools in Chesterfield County, South Carolina
Public middle schools in South Carolina
Chesterfield County School District